Kenneth Ernest Austin (9 October 1914 – 14 August 1986) was an Australian politician.

He was elected to the Tasmanian House of Assembly in 1964 as a Labor member for Denison. He served as Chair of Committees from 1974 until his defeat in 1976. He died in Hobart.

References

1914 births
1986 deaths
Australian Labor Party members of the Parliament of Tasmania
Members of the Tasmanian House of Assembly
20th-century Australian politicians